Sharq El Owainat Airport  is a small airport serving Sharq El Owainat which is located in Western Desert of Egypt. The airport caters to the New Valley Governorate. In 2011, it served 6,559 passengers (-0.8% compared to 2010).

Operations and facilities
The US$3 million airport was constructed in 3 months in 2003 to meet the needs of investors to bring equipment and to export crops. It occupies 36 square kilometres, with a main runway of 3500m and an apron that can serve 8 aircraft. A simple terminal building can serve passengers at a rate of 100 per hour. No automatic luggage conveyor is provided inside the terminal.

The Shark El Oweinat non-directional beacon (Ident: OWT) is located just east of the field.

In August 2009, EgyptAir signed an agreement with a UAE-based agricultural investment firm Janan Investment Company to operate a weekly Sunday flight from the capital's Cairo International Airport to Sharq El Owainat Airport in order to serve the movement of workers and investors to encourage agricultural investment in the region.

The airport is managed under a Build-Operate-Transfer operation. The runway is not equipped with lights for night operation. The airport is in a free trade zone and has facilities for storing and packaging goods for export.

Airlines and destinations
No airlines currently operate from the airport.

See also 
Transport in Egypt
List of airports in Egypt

References

External links
OpenStreeMap – Sharq El Owainat
OurAirports – Shark El Oweinat

Airports in Egypt
Airports established in 2003
2003 establishments in Egypt
New Valley Governorate
Western Desert (Egypt)
21st-century architecture in Egypt